Heinrich Stromer (c. 1476 – 1542) was a physician of the German Renaissance, professor  rector at the University of Leipzig and founder of  Auerbachs Keller.

Born in Auerbach in der Oberpfalz, he enrolled at Leipzig University in 1497, receiving the title of magister in 1501 and a professorship in philosophy as well as the office of rector in 1508.
He graduated in medicine in 1511, and was professor of pathology from 1516 and dean of the medical faculty from 1523. He was popularly known as Dr. Auerbach after his native town.

He married  Anna Hummelshain, daughter of a rich Leipzig patrician, in 1519. He built Auerbachs Hof during 1530–1538
 
Stromer was personal physician to several noblemen, including George, Duke of Saxony, Joachim I Nestor, Elector of Brandenburg and Albert of Brandenburg.
During the Protestant Reformation he was in correspondence with Martin Luther, Philipp Melanchthon, Ulrich von Hutten and Erasmus von Rotterdam.

Works

 Algorithmus linealis numerationem, Additionem, Subtractionem, Duplationem, Mediationem, Multiplicationem, Divisionem et Progressionem una cum regula de Tri perstringens. Leipzig (Martin Landsberg) 1504 
 Opusculum observationum bone valitudinis, quod vulgo regimen sanitatis inscribitur Arnaldi de noua villa. ca. 1510 
 Saluberrimae adversus pestilentiam observationes.   1516 
 Duae epistolae Henrici Stromeri Auerbachii et Gregori Coppi Calvi medicorum. Leipzig 1520  
 Sermo panegyricus Petro Mosellanus. Leipzig 1520 
 Decreta aliquot medica, quae in disquisitiones publicam proponentur. Leipzig 1532 
 De morte hominis decreta aliquot medica. Leipzig 1531 
 Decreta medica et senectute.

References

     
 Gustav Wustmann: Der Wirt von Auerbachs Keller in Leipzig: Dr. Heinrich Stromer von Auerbach 1482–1542. Mit 7 Briefen Stromers an Spalatin. Seemann, Leipzig 1902.
Fritz Schnelbögl: Auerbach in der Oberpfalz. Aus der Geschichte der Stadt und ihres Umlandes. Auerbach 1976 (p. 155)

16th-century German physicians
Academic staff of Leipzig University
Leipzig University alumni
1542 deaths
Year of birth uncertain
16th-century German writers
16th-century German male writers
People from Amberg-Sulzbach